Victor Tourjansky (born Viatcheslav Tourjansky; 4 March 1891, Kiev – 13 August 1976, (Munich)) was a Russian actor, screenwriter and film director who emigrated after the Russian Revolution of 1917. He worked in France, Germany, Italy, and the United States.

Biography

Born into a family of artists in Kiev, Tourjansky moved to Moscow in 1911, where he spent a year studying under Konstantin Stanislavski. He became involved with silent film and, two years later, made his first productions as a screenwriter and director on the eve of World War I. When the October Revolution broke out, he left and stayed in Yalta, which had not yet been taken by the Bolsheviks.

When the laws for the nationalisation of the cinema industry were applied to Crimea, he left with the Ermoliev film company and its actors for France, via Constantinople, in February 1920. He was accompanied by his wife, the actress Nathalie Kovanko. On arriving in Paris, he changed his birth name Viatcheslav, to Victor, which was more easily pronounceable for the French. He was the assistant to Abel Gance for the filming of his Napoléon (1927). He later worked for Universum Film AG in Germany, where he arrived during the 1930s and directed twelve films, of which several were officially honored by the Nazis (City of Anatol, Secret Code LB 17, Faded Melody, Enemies , and Orient Express).

Selected filmography

  (Russia, 1915)
  (Russia, 1915)
  (Russia, 1918)
  (France, 1921)
 Les Contes des mille et une nuits (France, 1921)
 Le Quinzième prélude de Chopin (France, 1922)
 Nuit de carnaval (France, 1922)
 La Riposte (France, 1922)
 Calvaire d'amour (France, 1923)
  (France, 1923)
  (France, 1924)
 La Dame masquée (France, 1924)
  (France, 1925)
 Michel Strogoff (France, 1926)
 Tempest (director: Sam Taylor, USA, 1928), uncredited
 The Adventurer (USA, 1928)
 Volga Volga (Germany, 1928)
 Manolescu (Germany, 1929)
 The Eaglet (French-language film version, 1931)
 The Duke of Reichstadt (German-language film version, 1931)
 The Unknown Singer (France, 1931)
 Student's Hotel (France, 1932)
 The Orderly (France, 1933)
 Volga in Flames (France, 1934)

 Dark Eyes (France, 1935)
 The World's in Love (Austria, 1935)
 La Peur (France, 1936)
 City of Anatol (German-language film version, 1936)
 Wells in Flames (French-language film version, 1937)
 The Lie of Nina Petrovna (France, 1937)
  (France, 1938)
 Faded Melody (Germany, 1938)
 Secret Code LB 17 (Germany, 1938)
 The Blue Fox (Germany, 1938)
 The Governor (Germany, 1939)
 A Woman Like You (Germany, 1939)
 Enemies (Germany, 1940, also screenplay)
  (Germany, 1940)
  (Germany, 1941, also screenplay)
 Liebesgeschichten (Germany, 1943)
 Tonelli (Germany, 1943, also screenplay)
 Orient Express (Germany, 1944)
  (Germany, 1945–1949)
 The Blue Straw Hat (West Germany, 1949)
  (Spain, 1950)
 The Man Who Wanted to Live Twice (West Germany, 1950)
 Chased by the Devil (West Germany, 1950)
  (West Germany, 1951)
 Marriage for One Night (West Germany, 1953)
 Salto Mortale (West Germany, 1953)
 Arlette Conquers Paris (West Germany, 1953)
 Daybreak (West Germany, 1954)
 Island of the Dead (West Germany, 1955)
 The Royal Waltz (West Germany, 1955)
  (West Germany, 1956)
 The Goddess of Love (co-director: Fernando Cerchio, Italy, 1957)
 Heart Without Mercy (West Germany, 1958)
 Herod the Great (co-director: , Italy, 1959)
 Prisoner of the Volga (co-director: , Italy, 1959)
 The Cossacks (co-director: Giorgio Rivalta, Italy, 1960)
 The Pharaohs' Woman (co-director: Giorgio Rivalta, Italy, 1960)
 The Triumph of Michael Strogoff (France, 1961)
 A Queen for Caesar (co-director: Piero Pierotti, Italy, 1962)

External links

Christian Gilles, Le cinéma des années [trente, quarante, cinquante] par ceux qui l'ont fait, Paris : L'Harmattan, 2000. 

Film directors from the Russian Empire
Male actors from the Russian Empire
People who emigrated to escape Bolshevism
1891 births
1976 deaths
Actors from Kyiv
Emigrants from the Russian Empire to Germany
Emigrants from the Russian Empire to France
White Russian emigrants to Germany
White Russian emigrants to France
Russian male film actors
Russian film directors
Russian male silent film actors
Film people from Kyiv